St. Norbert is a former provincial electoral division in the Canadian province of Manitoba.

Historical riding
The original riding of St. Norbert was established at the time of the province's creation in 1870. For the 1870 provincial election, it was divided into two separate ridings: St. Norbert North and St. Norbert South. Subsequently, it was reduced to a single riding.

St. Norbert was a francophone-majority riding. It was eliminated in 1879, at a time when francophone representation in the province was being reduced.

List of provincial representatives (St. Norbert North)

List of provincial representatives (St. Norbert South)

List of provincial representatives (St. Norbert)

Most recent riding
It was recreated by redistribution in 1979, and was contested at the 1981 Manitoba general election. It was abolished at the redistribution of 2018 and ceased to exist under its old name effective at the 2019 Manitoba general election. The riding was located in the southernmost tip of the City of Winnipeg.

St. Norbert was bordered to the east by Seine River, to the south and west by the rural ridings of Dawson Trail and Morris (respectively), and to the north by Riel, Fort Garry (later Fort Richmond) and Fort Whyte. The riding's character is suburban.

St. Norbert's population in 1996 was 19,184. In 1999, the average family income was $59,444, and the unemployment rate was 8.20%. The riding is ethnically diverse: 5% of the riding's residents are German, 4% are Chinese, 3% are East Indian and 2% are Italian. Six per cent of the riding's residents are francophone. Almost 28% of the riding's residents have a university degree.

The service sector accounts for 16% of St. Norbert's industry, with a further 15% in the educational services.

List of provincial representatives

Electoral results

1870 general election St. Norbert North

1870 general election St. Norbert South

1874 general election

1878 general election

1879 by-election

1981 general election

1986 general election

1988 general election

1990 general election

1995 general election

1999 general election

2003 general election

2007 general election

2011 general election

2016 general election

Previous boundaries

References

Former provincial electoral districts of Manitoba
Politics of Winnipeg